The GPD Win 2 is a Windows-based palmtop computer that is the successor to the GPD Win.  It is manufactured by Chinese company GamePad Digital, and crowdfunded just as its predecessor was.  Announced in first-quarter 2017, the crowdfunding campaign officially kicked off on January 15, 2018, and quickly surpassed its goal. It was released in May 2018.

The GPD Win 2 is rated to run more technically demanding video games, and to better run newer generation video game emulators.

History 
 GamePad Digital released the GPD Win in October 2016.  This was meant to be an answer to the lack of x86 Windows-based mobile gaming devices.  The Win met with success, surpassing its target funding. Building upon this success, they announced the GPD Win 2 in 2017.  By December 2017, tech media outlets such as TechRadar, The Verge, Slash Gear, ExtremeTech, and more were providing write ups and technical specs of pre-production units.

The Indiegogo campaign for the Win 2 quickly became a success, surpassing its stated $100,000 goal by roughly 1800% at almost $1.8 million with over 2,200 pre-order backers.  Backers will get the device for $649, which is $250 off of the stated retail price upon release.   However, GamePad Digital never changed the price of the original GPD Win upon release ($330 target retail price), with retail buyers paying the same amount as backers.  By the end of the campaign, the project received $2,700,000 of backing.

Software 
Like its predecessor, the GPD Win 2 runs 64-bit Windows 10 Home. The system is also capable of running Linux operating systems. It has DirectX 12 and OpenGL 4.4 support.  Pre-release testers have said that Linux "works perfectly", but that it's still best to use a lightweight distribution for maximum multitasking performance.

Design 
The GPD Win 2 frame is made of magnesium alloy, with a replaceable black ABS cover.  The main shell is made of ABS to reduce weight.  It has an 80-key QWERTY keyboard that extends across the body of the device.  This differs from the GPD Win, which had a column of keys on the right side.

The game controller has the same dual analog sticks flanking the face of the device, moved outboard from their position on the original GPD Win. The ABXY keys have remained, but likewise moved inboard.  The D-pad has been brought back as well.  The mouse switch has removed D-input, only having an X-input and a mouse function (although software exists to use D-input games properly with an X-input).  The shoulders have the standard L1/R1 and L2/R2 buttons, however the L3/R3 buttons have been moved to the shoulders from the keyboard as on the original GPD Win, for a total of six shoulder buttons. The top of the device has various I/O ports: USB-C, USB-A (3.0), MicroSD card slot, 3.5mm headphone jack, and a Micro HDMI port, a change from the Mini HDMI port featured on the Win.  An AHCI M.2 SSD slot is present on the back of the device, underneath a removable cover. The GPD Win 2 has dual speakers on either side the face just under each analog stick. The top and back of the device have cooling fan grates.  The screen has been increased from 5.5" to 6", and is an H-IPS capacitive 10-point touch screen that is reinforced with Gorilla Glass 4.

Technical specifications 
To facilitate the desired improved performance over the GPD Win, GamePad Digital upgraded the original model's Intel Atom CPU to an Intel Core M3-7Y30 CPU, with a base clock speed of 1.0 GHz, and a max of 2.6 GHz with Turbo Boost.  This gives a single and multi-core performance with four and two times the benchmark points respectively, as the Intel Atom x7-Z8750 CPU found in the GPD Win.  The 9th generation Intel HD Graphics 615 integrated card has 24 EU, up 8 more from the 405 card in the Win, and has a max dynamic frequency of 900 MHz, up from 600 MHz on the Win.

The cooling system for the GPD Win 2 was overhauled to meet the needs of the upgraded CPU, the M3's thermal design point having increased over threefold, to 15 Watts.  It contains an auto controlled fan and a heat sink.  The turbofan has a dynamic range of 2000 to 8800RPM, with a reported increase of eightfold over its predecessor.  GamePad Digital has changed the motherboard design to accommodate the cooling system.  The GPD Win used an L-type motherboard, and the Win 2 uses a dual motherboard design.

The RAM has been doubled to 8GB of LPDDR3, the same memory type as the GPD Win.  Foregoing the eMMC storage of the GPD Win, the GPD Win 2 has a 128GB M.2 2242 solid state drive.  The drive is also user-replaceable, with no capacity ceiling.  It has a max theoretical transfer speed of up to 600MB/s.  GamePad Digital also has retained the MicroSD slot due to popular demand, also having no capacity ceiling.

Despite the slightly larger display, the touch screen retains the 1280x720 resolution of its predecessor; however, the device is 4K capable, and supports wireless display options.  The max supported resolution using the HDMI 1.4 protocol is 4096x2304 at 24 Hz refresh rate.  The device supports both Miracast and Intel WiDi wireless display technologies.

The GPD Win 2 has two 4900mAh polymer lithium batteries with 7.6V output, 37.24Wh of power, and 600Wh/L energy density. This is a claimed 49% increase of battery capacity over the GPD Win. The battery has been rated for a maximum of 6 hours of gameplay battery life. GamePad Digital claims the Win 2 to be the first device to support PD 2.0 fast charge via the USB-C cable, and that it can go from half-full battery to full charge within 45 minutes.

Performance 
The GPD Win 2 has been tested to run various modern games on low settings. Grand Theft Auto V has run at 38 FPS. Overwatch runs at 50–70 FPS, and The Elder Scrolls V: Skyrim runs at an average of 53 FPS.Street Fighter IV for instance can be seen running at three times faster frame rate than on the GPD Win.  Aside from improved frame rates than its predecessor, game loading times have also decreased considerably.

Release and reception 
GamePad Digital started shipping units to pre-order backers in May 2018. Linus Sebastian reviewed a pre-release version in January 2018.  He said that he did not think that the speakers were great, but acknowledged that he was reviewing a pre-production version.  He spoke positively on the keyboard, noting that it was already a significant improvement over its predecessor.  Also saying that the shoulder buttons have improved in quality, with a more firm clicking feeling.  He praised the ease of access of making configuration changes on the Win 2 as opposed to other portable devices.  As far as performance, he noted that integrated graphics leave a lot to be desired, and that newer games will still have stutter, and mediocre frame rates.  But that older games are generally fine.  He did note an increase in emulation performance, testing games like Star Fox: Assault in Dolphin and Grand Theft Auto III in PCSX2.  He noted that there may be some slowdown in some games, but that the input lag is negligible.

Gallery

See also 

 Comparison of handheld game consoles
 GPD Win
 GPD Win 3
 GPD XD
 PC gaming
 Handheld game console

References

External links 
  (English)
  (中文)

Handheld personal computers
Indiegogo projects